Kadambur is a village in the udayarpalayam taluk of Ariyalur district, Tamil Nadu, India.

Demographics 
 census, Kadambur had a total population of 4,128 with 2,057 males and 2,071 females.

References 

Villages in Ariyalur district